The 2022 Mr. Olympia contest 
was an IFBB professional bodybuilding competition and expo  held from December 15–18, 2022, at the Planet Hollywood Las Vegas, in Paradise, Nevada. Concurrently, the Olympia fitness expo was held at the Las Vegas Convention Center. It was the 58th Mr. Olympia competition held. Other events at the exhibition included the 2022 212 Olympia Showdown, as well as finals in Men's Classic, Men's Physique, 2022 Ms. Olympia, Fitness, 2022 Figure, 2022 Bikini Olympia, among other contests.

Venue

The Olympia made a return to its traditional hosting venue in Las Vegas, Nevada, after spending two years in Orlando, Florida, due to the onset of the COVID-19 pandemic. Having overcome the challenges of previous years, the event returned to its pre-COVID size with many competitors and fans from across the world in attendance. As in recent years, the show continued to be streamed live to a global audience.

Results
Hadi Choopan won the 58th edition of Mr. Olympia Men's Open competition in 2022, with a prize of $400,000. Derek Lunsford came in second with a prize of $150,000. Ten other winners from multiple divisions were crowned during the two days of division finals, including Chris Bumstead, who won the Classic Physique title for the fourth consecutive time, and Shaun Clarida, who managed to win back the 212 Division title after losing it in 2021.

The 2022 Olympia saw a changing of the guard of sorts as Hadi Choopan beat two-time champion Mamdouh "Big Ramy" Elssbiay to claim his first Olympia title. In addition, newcomers to the Men's Open, such as Derek Lunsford (formerly a 212 competitor) and Andrew Jacked, performed better than longtime stars like William Bonac and Iain Valliere. The competition also saw a much larger field than in the preceding two years thanks to a decline in COVID-19 cases and subsequent restrictions, with competitors hailing from nations as diverse as Ireland, Nigeria, Brazil, and Slovakia.

Aftermath
The 2022 Mr Olympia saw a record amount of competitors in the open category, which led to almost half of all competitors placing in the unranked 16th place. As a result the IFBB announced that to qualify for ongoing Mr. Olympia finals, competitors must win at least one professional show, ending the points qualification system.

Additionally as a result of the large number of finalists, the finals witnessed significant time overruns with the Open finals ending at 1 am local time, due to the many competitors in each division. This led to significant complaints by coaches such as Chris Aceto as well as complaints over crowding backstage and a lack of professionalism by competitors and commentators such as Jay Cutler and James Hollingshead. It remains to be seen if the IFBB will address these concerns going forward.

References

External links 

 2022
Mr Olympia
2022 in bodybuilding